Jinli is a street in Chengdu, Sichuan, China.

The street is about 550 meters long. It is a part of the Temple of Marquis, and the buildings are in the Qing Dynasty style. The theme is Three Kingdoms Culture, a traditional folk custom. There are many bars, inns, snack stores and souvenir shops. The street was renovated in 2004.

In 2005, Jinli was named as “National Top Ten City Commercial Pedestrian Street”. In 2006, Jinli was named as “National Demonstration Base Of The Cultural Industry” by the Ministry of Culture. There are approximately 18,000,000 visitors a year. Especially during the Spring Festival, more people come to visit the "Big Temple Fair".

References

External links
 

Streets in Chengdu
Tourist attractions in Chengdu
History of Chengdu
Restaurant districts and streets in China
Shopping districts and streets in China
Pedestrian malls